Harold Long (April 10, 1941 – May 21, 2013) was a politician in British Columbia (BC), Canada.

Long was born in Powell River, the son of George Hibbert Long and Augusta Denise Simard, and from 1958 he worked in the family transportation business (City Transfer) and in 1979 purchased and expanded it. In 1961, he married Beverley Ann Doxsee.

He served as Member of the Legislative Assembly (MLA) for Mackenzie from 1986 to 1991 as a Social Credit MLA. He served as Deputy Whip for the Government Caucus and worked as a BC Ferries director until 1991. He was defeated in the 1991 election in the renamed riding of Powell River-Sunshine Coast by Gordon Wilson, then leader of the BC Liberals. Following his defeat, he returned to his family business and was elected in 1992 in a by-election to the Powell River municipal council. He was elected for Powell River-Sunshine Coast in the provincial 2001 election as a BC Liberal candidate. Long did not run for reelection in 2005.

He held positions as Deputy Chair of the Committee of the Whole and was  member of the Government Caucus Committee on Natural Resources.

He was awarded the Golden Jubilee Medal in 2002.

Death
Long, aged 72, was the pilot and sole occupant of a DHC-2 Beaver float plane that was seen overturned in Bute Inlet, near Stuart Island, north of the city of Campbell River, on May 21, 2013. The Canadian Coast Guard and Royal Canadian Mounted Police recovered his body from the scene.

References

1941 births
2013 deaths
21st-century Canadian politicians
British Columbia Liberal Party MLAs
British Columbia Social Credit Party MLAs
Aviators killed in aviation accidents or incidents in Canada
Accidental deaths in British Columbia
British Columbia municipal councillors
Victims of aviation accidents or incidents in 2013